is a near-Earth object of the Atira group. It orbits the Sun in 151 days.

Discovery

Discovered at only 19th magnitude, it is very difficult to see, never getting far from the sun and twilight. It only occasionally brightens above 16th magnitude. Discovery was made using the Zwicky Transient Facility.

Orbit and classification 

It orbits the Sun at a distance of 0.3–0.8 AU once every 5 months (151 days; semi-major axis of 0.56 AU). Its orbit has an eccentricity of 0.43 and an unusually high inclination of 30° with respect to the ecliptic.

References

External links 
 
 

Minor planet object articles (unnumbered)
Discoveries by the Zwicky Transient Facility
20190610